A Walled garden is a planned place of flora surrounded by walls.

Walled garden may also refer to:

 Walled garden (technology), a closed or exclusive set of information services provided for users
 Walled Gardens, a memoir by Annabel Davis-Goff